Gasto may refer to:

 "Gasto", a song by Bad Gyal from Warm Up
 Juan Gastó, Peruvian colonel

See also 
 Gastro
 Gastos